FC Priazovye Yeysk is a Russian football team from Yeysk. It played professionally from 1990 to 1992. Their best result was 13th place in the Zone 2 of the Russian Second Division in 1992. As of 2009, it plays in the First League of Krasnodar Krai Championship (sixth-highest tier).

Team name history
 1979–1992: FC Start Yeysk
 2000–present: FC Priazovye Yeysk

External links
  Team history at KLISF

Association football clubs established in 1979
Football clubs in Russia
Sport in Krasnodar Krai
1979 establishments in Russia